Jerome Marie Thibault Stephanie de Clarens (born 12 May 1989) is a retired French footballer, who played as a midfielder.

Club career
De Clarens moved to Hong Kong in December 2012, having played football at semi-professional level in his native France. He went on trial with First Division side Kwai Tsing, and was immediately signed, becoming the first French player in the club's history.

Following two successful seasons with Kwai Tsing, De Clarens signed for Hong Kong FC, and helped them gain promotion to the Hong Kong Premier League.

References

External links
 
 Jerome De Clarens at HKFA

1989 births
Living people
French footballers
Association football midfielders
AS Poissy players
US Concarneau players
Footballers from Paris